Gymnogramma is a genus of moths in the family Lacturidae.

Type species: Gymnogramma rufiventris (Zeller, 1852)

Species
Some species of this genus are:
Gymnogramma atmocycla Meyrick, 1918
Gymnogramma candidella (Viette, 1963)
Gymnogramma cyanea Meyrick, 1912
Gymnogramma eoxantha Meyrick, 1921
Gymnogramma flavivitella (Walsingham, 1881)
Gymnogramma griveaudi (Gibeaux, 1982)
Gymnogramma hollandi (Walsingham, 1897)
Gymnogramma hutchinsoni Walsingham, 1891
Gymnogramma iambiodella (Viette, 1958)
Gymnogramma luctuosa (Gibeaux, 1982)
Gymnogramma plagiula Meyrick, 1923
Gymnogramma privata Meyrick, 1924
Gymnogramma psyllodecta Meyrick, 1924
Gymnogramma pyrozancla Meyrick, 1911
Gymnogramma racemosa Meyrick, 1918
Gymnogramma ratovosoni (Gibeaux, 1982)
Gymnogramma rhodoneura Meyrick, 1909
Gymnogramma rufiventris (Zeller, 1852)
Gymnogramma sphaerobola Meyrick, 1924
Gymnogramma tabulatrix Meyrick, 1930
Gymnogramma toulgoeti (Gibeaux, 1982)
Gymnogramma viettei (Gibeaux, 1982)

References

Zeller, P. C. 1852a. Lepidoptera Microptera, quae J. A. Wahlberg in Caffrorum terra collegit. - — :1–120.

Zygaenoidea
Zygaenoidea genera